Silosovo (Silisaw) is a rural locality (a village) in Badrakovsky Selsoviet, Burayevsky District, Bashkortostan, Russia. The population was 284 as of 2010. There are 5 streets.

Geography 
Silosovo is located 24 km southwest of Burayevo (the district's administrative centre) by road. Bolshebadrakovo is the nearest rural locality.

References 

Rural localities in Burayevsky District